Hypolycaena irawana is a butterfly of the family Lycaenidae first described by Hisakazu Hayashi, Heinz G. Schroeder and Colin G. Treadaway in 1984. It is found in Palawan in the Philippines.

References

,  & , 1984. New lycaenid butterflies from the Philippines. Senck. biol. 65 (1/2): 29–41.
, 1995. Checklist of the butterflies of the Philippine Islands (Lepidoptera: Rhopalocera) Nachrichten des Entomologischen Vereins Apollo Suppl. 14: 7–118.

, 2012: Revised checklist of the butterflies of the Philippine Islands (Lepidoptera: Rhopalocera). Nachrichten des Entomologischen Vereins Apollo, Suppl. 20: 1–64.

Butterflies described in 1984
Hypolycaenini